Al-Manathera District is a district of the Najaf Governorate, Iraq.

Districts of Najaf Province